Rita Braver (born April 12, 1948) is an American television news correspondent, currently working with CBS News, and who is best known for her investigative journalism of White House scandals such as the Iran-Contra affair.


Biography
Rita Lynn Braver was born to a Jewish family on April 12, 1948 and raised in Silver Spring, Maryland. Her father died while she was a teenager. She has two sisters: Bettie Braver Sugar and Sharon Braver Cohen. She graduated from the University of Wisconsin-Madison with a degree in political science, and spent a few years at WWL-TV in New Orleans as a copy girl before moving to Washington, D.C. with her husband and joining CBS in 1972 as a producer.

From 1983-93, Braver served as CBS News's chief law correspondent. She broke the story of the John Walker spy ring, as well as that of another spy, Jonathan Pollard. She also led CBS's coverage of the Iran-Contra affair. She served as CBS's chief White House correspondent during Bill Clinton's first term, and since 1998 has been chief national correspondent for Sunday Morning.

Personal life
On April 10, 1972, she married Washington, D.C. lawyer Robert B. Barnett (born 1946) whom she met in college. They have a daughter, Meredith Jane Barnett (born 1978); Meredith married Daniel Ross Penn in a Jewish ceremony in Washington D.C.

References

External links
Articles at HuffPost
Profile at CBS News

Living people
American television reporters and correspondents
Jewish American journalists
University of Wisconsin–Madison College of Letters and Science alumni
CBS News people
1948 births
People from Silver Spring, Maryland
American women television journalists
People from Washington, D.C.
Bethesda-Chevy Chase High School alumni
21st-century American Jews
21st-century American women